DDL may refer to:

Technology
Data definition language or data description language, relating to databases
Description Definition Language, part of the MPEG-7 standard
Device Description Language,  related to field devices for process and factory automation
Digital data logger, a type of data logger, an electronic device that records data over time or in relation to location
Direct download link, hyperlink for file download
Dolby Digital Live, real-time audio compression
Drop-down list, graphical user interface control element
An acronym for the Australian light destroyer project

Other
Data-driven learning, an approach to learning foreign languages
Den Danske Landinspektørforening, the Danish Association of Chartered Surveyors
Det Danske Luftfartselskab, Danish airline
Dutch Defence League, a Dutch offshoot of the English Defence League